Tricarinodynerus is a genus of potter wasps known from the Afrotropical and Palearctic regions.

References

Biological pest control wasps
Potter wasps